Thane Lok Sabha constituency (formerly, Thana Lok Sabha constituency) is one of the 48 Lok Sabha (parliamentary) constituencies of Maharashtra state in western India.

Assembly segments
At present, after the implementation of the Presidential notification on delimitation on 19 February 2008, Thane Lok Sabha constituency comprises six Vidhan Sabha (legislative assembly) segments. These segments are:

Members of Parliament

In 1952 and 1957, this Thane area contributed two members to Lok Sabha. 
1952: Govind Dharmaji Vartak, Indian National Congress
1952: Anant Savalaram Nandkar, Indian National Congress (ST)
1952:Choithram Partabrai Gidwani, PSP
1952 (by-poll): Yashwantrao Martandrao Mukne, Indian National Congress (ST)
1957: Shamrao Vishnu Parulekar, Communist Party of India
1957: Laxman Mahadu Matera, Communist Party of India (ST)

In 2008, the Delimitation Commission of India split the seat into Thane and Kalyan seats.

^ by-poll

Election results

2019

2014

2009

Bye-election 2008

2004

1999

See also
 Thane district
 List of Constituencies of the Lok Sabha

References

External links
Thane lok sabha  constituency election 2019 results details
http://results.eci.gov.in/pc/en/trends/statewiseS135.htm

Politics of Thane district
Lok Sabha constituencies in Maharashtra